The Leader of the Socialist Party is the most senior politician within the Socialist Party (SP) in the Netherlands. The post is currently held by Lilian Marijnissen, who succeeded Emile Roemer on 13 December 2017.

History
The Leaders outwardly act as the 'figurehead' and the main representative of the party. Within the party, they must ensure political consensus. Except during the tenure of Daan Monjé, the Leader is always the Lijsttrekker (lead candidate) of the party list at election time. Outside election time the Leader can serve as the Opposition leader. Since the tenure of Jan Marijnissen, the Leader is always the Parliamentary leader of the Socialist Party in the House of Representatives.

See also
 Socialist Party

References

External links
Official

  

 
 
Socialist Party
Netherlands politics-related lists